Papanashi is a village in the Gadag district of the Indian state of Karnataka. Papanashi is famous for the ancient Kalmeshwara Temple located in the village.

Demographics
Per the 2011 Census of India, Papanashi has a total population of 1296; of whom 620 are male and 676 female.

See also
Gadag
Munirabad
Hampi
Koppal
Karnataka

References

Villages in Gadag district